The Sequatchie darter (Etheostoma  sequatchiense) is a species of freshwater ray-finned fish, a darter from the subfamily Etheostomatinae, part of the family Percidae, which also contains the perches, ruffes and pikeperches. It is endemic to the eastern United States, where it occurs only in the Sequatchie River in Tennessee. It is considered by some authorities to be a subspecies of the blenny darter (Etheostoma blennius).

References

Etheostoma
Taxa named by Brooks M. Burr
Fish described in 1979